Cambaytherium is an extinct genus of placental mammals in the family Cambaytheriidae whose fossils were found in an open pit coal mine located in Gujarat, India. The mine was a treasure trove full of teeth and bones, over 200 of which were identified as belonging to Cambaytherium thewissi. The fossils were dated to the Early Eocene, 54.5 million years ago, making them slightly younger than the oldest known fossils belonging to the order Perissodactyla.

Description

Cambaytherium was a genus of herbivorous four-legged quadrupeds. The remains of the third species are too fragmentary to allow a consistent estimate of its size, although it appears to have been significantly larger than the others, perhaps weighing  or more. The shape and wear patterns of the teeth suggest that it was herbivorous, with a considerable amount of tough vegetation in its diet, such as nuts and abrasive leaves and stems.

Many of Cambaytherium's features, such as the teeth and the number of sacral vertebrae, are intermediate between Perissodactyla and earlier mammals and may be indicative of what the common ancestor of all of Perissodactyla looked like. The limbs have skeletal features suggesting that the animal was capable of running, but would not have been as fast as early perissodactyls. The fore-feet had at least four toes, and the hind-feet had five, one of which was vestigial, whereas even the earliest perissodactyls known had no more than four toes on each foot. The toes were short and stout, with most of the weight placed on digit three, which was slightly enlarged, as seen in living tapirs. The animal was likely at least digitigrade, and perhaps subunguligrade.

Taxonomy

Cambaytherium is considered to be close to the ancestry of Perissodactyla, the odd-toed ungulates. It retains features lost among the perissodactyls, a group which includes tapirs, rhinoceroses, and horses. An analysis published in 2019 placed the Cambaytheriidae as most closely related to the anthracobunids in the order Anthracobunia, a sister group to the true perissodactyls. In addition to Cambaytherium itself, the family includes Nakusia and Perissobune, which are known from more fragmentary remains.

The presence of a sister group of perissodactyls in western India near or before the time of its collision with Asia, suggests that Perissodactyla may have originated on the Indian Plate during its final drift toward Asia.

References

Eocene mammals of Asia
Odd-toed ungulates
Fossils of India
Eocene life
Fossil taxa described in 2005